The Andrey Sheptytsky National Museum of Lviv is one of Ukraine's largest museums, dedicated to Ukrainian culture in all its manifestations. It was established by Metropolitan Archbishop Andrey Sheptytsky in 1905 and was originally known as the Lwow Ecclesiastical Museum. It currently bears Sheptytsky's name.

History 

The founder donated some 10,000 items to the museum and raised the funds required for its maintenance. An extravagant Neo-Baroque villa was acquired to house the collections.

After the World War II, the museum was renamed the Lviv Museum of Ukrainian Art. The collection was augmented by adding a number of exhibits confiscated from other Lviv museums. By the late 20th century, the museum's holdings of Ukrainian icons and folk art were the largest in the country.

The National Museum now occupies the ornate building of the former Lviv Industrial Museum, which housed the Lenin Museum in Soviet times. A cluster of memorial houses and the Sokalshchina Museum in Chervonohrad are affiliated with the National Museum.

During the 2022 Russian invasion of Ukraine, works were removed from display for safety; they included the Bohorodchany iconostasis. The curator of books and manuscripts, Anna Naurobska, described the importance of the collections, as: “This is our story; this is our life. It is very important to us.”

Collection 
Nowadays the funds of the museum contain over 100,000 items, representing centuries-old traditions of development of Ukrainian art and national culture. It has four permanent exhibitions: "Old Ukrainian Art"; "Art of the XIXth to the Beginning of the XXth Century"; "Ukrainian Art of the XXth Century"; "Folk Art", with 1,800 objects on display. It also hosts temporary exhibitions.

The museum boasts the greatest and most magnificent collection of middle-age Ukrainian sacred art of the XIIth-XVIIIth centuries, including 4000 icons, sculptures, manuscripts (including the Horodyshche or Buchach Gospel), etc. Most lavishly represented in the collection of the museum are icons from the XIVth-XVIIIth centuries, mainly from Western Ukraine. It is known that Illarion Swiecki came to the village of Mshanets, Boykiv, to personally take some of the older icons from the Church of the Nativity of the Blessed Virgin to the museum.

The Ukrainian renaissance and baroque periods are represented by the works of Ivan Rutkovych (the Zhovkva iconostasis of the 17th century) and Jov Kondzelevich (the Bogorodchansky iconostasis, 1698–1705).

There is a precious collection of Ukrainian prints of the XVIIth-XVIIIth centuries (about 1000 pieces).

The museum has paintings by artists such as Johann Georg Pinsel, Ivan Rutkovych, Serhii Vasylkivsky, Antin Manastyrsky, Ivan Trush, Olena Kulchytska, Mykhailo Boychuk, Jakiw Hnizdowskyj, Oleksa Hryshchenko, Liuboslav Hutsaliuk, Vasyl Krychevsky, Michał Filewicz, Józefat Ignacy Łukasiewicz, Pyotr Ilyich Bilan, Oleksa Novakivskyi, Ivan Trush, Oleksandr Murashko and Taras Shevchenko and others.

The National Museum of Lviv also has a number of important manuscripts, some of them very rare such as Cracow publications by Schweipolt Fiol (1491-1493), Prague and Vienna printings by Francysk Skaryna, and virtually all of Ivan Fedorov's publications.

Foundation
Scientific and Artistic Foundation of the metropolitan bishop Andrey Sheptytsky.
 Memorial Art Museum Olena Kulchytska, Lviv
 Memorial Museum of Art Oleksa Novakivskyi, Lviv
 Leopold Levitsky Memorial Museum of Art, Lviv
 Mykhailo Bilas Art Museum, Truskavets
 Memorial Museum of Art Ivan Trush, Lviv
 Sokalshchyna Art Museum, Chervonohrad
 Boykivshchyna Art Museum, Sambir

Gallery of some works on display

References

External links
 Sofiia Yaniv. National Museum in Internet Encyclopedia of Ukraine

Museums in Lviv
Art museums and galleries in Ukraine
Museums established in 1905
Folk art museums and galleries
1905 establishments in Austria-Hungary